Dual specificity mitogen-activated protein kinase kinase 6 also known as MAP kinase kinase 6 (MAPKK 6) or MAPK/ERK kinase 6 is an enzyme that in humans is encoded by the MAP2K6 gene, on chromosome 17.

Function 

MAPKK 6 is a member of the dual specificity protein kinase family, which functions as a mitogen-activated protein (MAP) kinase kinase. MAP kinases, also known as extracellular signal-regulated kinases (ERKs), act as an integration point for multiple biochemical signals. This protein phosphorylates and activates p38 MAP kinase in response to inflammatory cytokines or environmental stress. As an essential component of p38 MAP kinase mediated signal transduction pathway, this gene is involved in many cellular processes such as stress-induced cell cycle arrest, transcription activation and apoptosis.

Interactions 

MAP2K6 has been shown to interact with TAOK2, ASK1, MAPK14 and MAP3K7.

References

Further reading 

 
 
 
 
 
 
 
 
 
 
 
 
 
 
 
 
 
 

EC 2.7.12